Quinley Mirielle Campomanes Quezada-Keča (born April 7, 1997) is a professional footballer who plays as a forward for Red Star Belgrade in the Serbian Women's Super League. Born in the United States, she represents the Philippines women's national team.

Early life and education
Quinley Mirielle Campomanes Quezada was born on April 7, 1997 to Raul and Ruth Quezada. She attended Rosemead High School where she lettered in soccer, cross country and track. For her collegiate studies, she entered University of California, Riverside.

Career

High school
Quezada played for the women's soccer team of Rosemead High School. She was named part of the First Team All League for the 2011–2015 seasons. She was recognized as the All-Mission Valley League Offensive Player of the Year in 2011 and 2015 as well as the Female Athlete of the Year as a senior student.

Quezada began her club youth soccer career in 2010 in the U14 division at FC Golden State where she played for two seasons, followed by playing for LA Premier FC for the following three seasons. Quezada was a prolific finisher, scoring over 180 goals over the course of her youth career.

College
Quezada debuted for UC Riverside Highlanders women's soccer in 2015 during the team's season opening match against the George Washington Colonials. In the 2016 season, she was the second player among the Highlanders with the most goals scored, and tied for third in terms of points with another player. In the 2017 season, she was the top two player within the team in goals scored, assists made, and points earned. In the 2018 season, Quezada finished second on the team in goals (4), assists (2), and points (10). Quezada scored the game-winning goals in the Highlanders' 1–0 victory over UNLV on September 16 and the 1–0 win over Long Beach State on October 18 on Senior Night, earning her Second Team All-Conference recognition.

Club

Taiwan and United States
Quezada in 2020 played for Xinbei Hangyuan in the Taiwan Mulan Football League. She also played for Legends FC of the Women's Premier Soccer League.

JEF United Chiba
In mid-2021, Quezada was signed in by JEF United Chiba of the WE League of Japan. She made her debut for JEF United Chiba on October 2, 2021, and was the first Filipino to play a match in the WE League. She came in as a substitute in the 82nd minute in her side's 0–3 lost to Tokyo Verdy Beleza. She featured in nine games for Chiba.

Red Star Belgrade
Quezada moved to ZFK Red Star Belgrade of the Serbian Women's Super League in June 2022.

International
At the 2018 AFC Women's Asian Cup, Quezada was among the players that were part of the Philippines women's national football team that partook in the tournament. This meant that Quezada is the first women's soccer player of the UC Riverside Highlanders to be a part of a senior FIFA Women's World Cup qualifying roster. Quezada was a starter for all four of the team's matches: the three group play matches against Jordan, China, Thailand, and the 5th-place match against Korea Republic. The team opened the tournament with a 2–1 win against host Jordan

Quezada was also part of the Philippine national team roster for the 2018 AFF Women's Championship. She did not feature in the Philippines opener match against Myanmar due to recovering from a minor injury sustained during training camp, where the team lost 0–4. In the second match, Quezada came in as a substitute for Eva Madarang in the 60th minute  in the team's 3–0 win over Singapore where she scored her first international goal in the 77th minute. In the third match against Vietnam, Quezada came in as a substitute in the 45th minute. In the fourth and final match of the tournament against Indonesia, Quezada would start the match and score the final goal of the match in stoppage time to help the team secure a result with a 3–3 draw after the team took a 2–0 lead into halftime but subsequently conceded 3 consecutive second-half goals.

International goals
Scores and results list the Philippines' goal tally first.

Honours

International

Philippines
Southeast Asian Games third place: 2021
AFF Women's Championship: 2022

References

1997 births
Living people
University of California, Riverside alumni
Filipino women's footballers
Philippines women's international footballers
Women's association football midfielders
UC Riverside Highlanders women's soccer players
Soccer players from California
American sportspeople of Filipino descent
Citizens of the Philippines through descent
American women's soccer players
Competitors at the 2019 Southeast Asian Games
JEF United Chiba Ladies players
WE League players
Southeast Asian Games bronze medalists for the Philippines
Southeast Asian Games medalists in football
Competitors at the 2021 Southeast Asian Games